Wong Yat-cheong, better known by his stage name as Wong Jing (born 3 May 1955) or Barry Wong, is a Hong Kong film director, producer, actor, presenter, and screenwriter. A prolific filmmaker with strong instincts for crowd-pleasing and publicity, Wong Jing played a prominent role in Hong Kong cinema  during the 1990s.

Biography
Wong was born in Hong Kong, the son of noted film director Wong Tin-Lam. He graduated from the Chinese University of Hong Kong with a degree in Chinese literature which he describes as "useless" (Yang, 2003).

Like many Hong Kong film figures of his time, Wong began his career in television – in his case, scriptwriting for local juggernaut TVB beginning in 1975 (Teo, 1997). He moved on to writing for the Shaw Brothers studio. There, he made his directing debut with Challenge of the Gamesters (千王鬥千霸) in 1981. This start foreshadowed his later successes with movies about gambling, such as God of Gamblers, starring Chow Yun-fat and Andy Lau, which broke Hong Kong's all-time box office record upon its release in 1989, and started a fad for the genre.

Wong has directed, produced or written over 175 films (Yang, 2003), occasionally acting in them as well. He works with an efficient mass production method making heavy use of directing assistants and allowing him to work on several movies at once. He works under the umbrellas of two production companies he launched, Wong Jing's Workshop Ltd. and BoB and Partners Co. Ltd. (Best of the Best), the latter in partnership with director Andrew Lau and writer-producer Manfred Wong (Bordwell, 2000).

He once commented that his movies were hits because he gave the people what they wanted, and not what he thought they should want. A typical Wong production might be a broad comedy (Boys Are Easy, 1993) or an entry in a currently popular genre, such as martial arts (Holy Weapon, 1993), erotic thriller (Naked Killer, 1992) or gangster film (Young and Dangerous, 1996). It will imbue its model with lightning pacing and frequent shifts in tone to accommodate slapstick and toilet humor, sentimental heart-tugging, cartoonish violence, sexual titillation, and parodic references to well-known Hong Kong and Hollywood films.

Wong also directed or produced several of the films of comic actor Stephen Chow, who has been Hong Kong's most popular performer since the early 1990s.  Examples of their collaborations include God of Gamblers II (1991), Tricky Brains (1991), Royal Tramp I and II (1992) and Sixty Million Dollar Man (1995).

Wong's commercial skills are not limited to the content of his movies or his casting.  He was using Hollywood-style cross-media promotional tactics – such as tie-in novels, comic books and other products, and magazine interviews – long before they became common in Hong Kong (Bordwell, 2000).

Wong's style, often seen as loud, crass and philistine, may be another factor in his low stock among critics. According to director Ann Hui, he remarked of Hui's acclaimed 1990 drama Song of the Exile, "Who wants to watch the autobiography of a fat woman?"  In 1994, unidentified assailants attacked him outside his offices and knocked out his teeth; this was widely believed to have been retaliation for injudicious remarks, ordered by Triads or Chinese organized crime figures, whose involvement in the industry is notorious, although Wong himself is rumored to be involved with the Triads.

Since the late 1990s, Wong's films have fared much worse in the box office due to the sluggish recession which has been enveloping Hong Kong cinema in the new millennium. However a number of his films released in the 2010s, such as From Vegas to Macau, have seen renewed success for the director, particularly in mainland China.

Filmography

References

 Bordwell, David.  Planet Hong Kong: Popular Cinema and the Art of Entertainment.  Cambridge, MA: Harvard University Press, 2000.  
 Dannen, Fredric, and Barry Long.  Hong Kong Babylon: The Insider's Guide to the Hollywood of the East.  New York: Miramax, 1997.  
 Teo, Stephen. Hong Kong Cinema: The Extra Dimensions. London: British Film Institute, 1997. 
 Yang, Jeff.  Once Upon a Time in China: A Guide to Hong Kong, Taiwanese, and Mainland Chinese Cinema.  New York: Atria, 2003.

External links
 
 Wong Jing profile page at Hong Kong Cinemagic
 Long interview with Wong Jing at Hong Kong Cinemagic

Hong Kong film directors
1955 births
Living people
Hong Kong male film actors
Hong Kong film producers
Hong Kong film presenters
Hong Kong screenwriters
Alumni of the Chinese University of Hong Kong
Hong Kong male television actors
20th-century Hong Kong male actors
21st-century Hong Kong male actors